Protein phosphatase 2A (PP2A) is a major intracellular protein phosphatase that regulates multiple aspects of cell growth and metabolism. Phosphorylation enables the activation or The ability of this widely distributed heterotrimeric enzyme to act on a diverse array of substrates is largely controlled by the nature of its regulatory B subunit. There are multiple families of B subunits, this family is called the B56 family.

Function
Protein phosphatase 2A (PP2A) is a major intracellular protein phosphatase that regulates multiple aspects of cell growth and metabolism such as DNA replication, transcription,
translation, cell cycle, development, and apoptosis.

In order to exhibit specificity control over catalysis, hetero-oligomers are formed so the catalytic subunits are complexed with regulatory subunits. This helps direct their action towards the cellular substrate. This is the function of the B56 domain.

B56 alpha, is additionally thought to play a role in nuclear export.

Structure
Regulatory B subunit is a heterotrimer.

Subcellular Localization
Mainly found in the cytoplasm, however various isoforms can be found in the nucleus.

Isoforms of B56 protein family
B56alpha
B56beta
B56delta
B56epsilon
B56gamma

References

External links 
 

Protein families